Valeria Vegh Weis is an Argentinean-German Author. She specializes in criminology, criminal law, international criminal law and transitional justice. Vegh Weis is a Research Fellow at Konstanz Universität Zukunftskolleg, 
where she focuses on the role of victims organizations to confront state crimes. She is also an Adjunct Professor at Buenos Aires University and Quilmes National University. She is the Vice President of the Instituto Latinoamericano de Criminología y Desarrollo Social . Vegh Weis won several awards, including the Critical Criminology of the Year Award by the American Society of Criminology .

Vegh Weis was previously an Alexander von Humboldt Fellow at Freie Universitat Berlin and a research associate at the Max Plank Institute for European Legal History where she focused on the role of the Global South in the development of transnational criminal regimes.

Biography 

Vegh Weis graduated summa cum laude from Buenos Aires University Law School. She pursued post-graduate studies in Criminal Law at Buenos Aires University School of Law and a Master in International Legal Studies at New York University. She also pursued a PhD in Law at the same university and defended her PhD thesis on a Marxist perspective of criminal selectivity. She has published extensively in Spanish and English on criminal law, criminology, transitional justice and mental health law.

She received the CONICET, Fulbright and Hauser Global Scholarships, the International Law and Human Rights  and the Transitional Justice Fellowship, among many others awards. She has been a Lecturer for the World Health Organization, a visiting professor at Strathmore University, a Post-Doctoral Visiting Researcher at Freie Universitat Berlin and a Post-Doctoral Fellow at the Max Planck Institute for European Legal History. She has been serving on the Argentinean Judiciary since 2005  and has also worked as Associate Personnel at the Inter-American Commission on Human Rights.

Books and chapters

In English 
 Vegh Weis, Valeria (2021). Criminalization of Activism. Historical, Present and Future Perspectives .
 Vegh Weis, Valeria (2017). Marxism and Criminology. A History of Criminal Selectivity. Boston: Brill. . The book has been released in paperback by Haymarket Books (2018) . The preface was written by Kent University Professor Roger Matthews and the foreword was authored by UC Berkeley Professor of Law Jonathan Simon. The book received the American Library Association Outstanding Academic Titles award in 2017. Art cover by Enzo Leone. The book also received the O utstanding Book Award from the Academy of Criminal Justice Sciences in 2019.

In Spanish 
 Vegh Weis, Valeria (2021). ¡Bienvenidos al Lawfare!. Written with Eugenio Raúl Zaffaroni and Cristina Caamaño. Prefaces by Atilio Borón, Luiz Inácio Lula da Silva and Elizabeth Gómez Alcorta ; . Republished in Portuguese

References 

Academic staff of the University of Buenos Aires
Argentine criminologists
Argentine women criminologists
German criminologists
German women criminologists